I Heart Movies (stylized as i ❤ movies) is a Philippine free-to-air television channel owned by GMA Network Inc. The channel was on test broadcast from March 22, 2021, until March 31, 2021, and was officially launched on April 5, 2021. It airs daily from 6:00 am to 12:00 midnight.

Overview 
I Heart Movies consists of local and Filipino-dubbed international films from its distributors including Paramount Pictures, Warner Bros. Pictures, Universal Pictures, Sony Pictures, Regency Enterprises, Lionsgate Films, Metro-Goldwyn-Mayer Studios Inc., Fortune Star Media Limited, APT Entertainment, OctoArts Films, Sampaguita Pictures, Unitel Pictures, Maverick Films, Viva Films, Star Cinema, and their own studio GMA Pictures, among others. As a digital channel, I Heart Movies would not compete with other movie channels in the Philippines that broadcast through cable and satellite.

On April 5, 2021, in-time for their launch, the channel released a new Station ID with the Theme Song "I Heart Movies" sing by Rita Daniela and Ken Chan.

Programming
As of March 18, 2023 , I Heart Movies films are divided into various programming blocks:
 Timeless Telesine – a block consisting of Filipino made for television films released in the 1990s. It airs at 6:00 a.m.
 Takilya Throwback – a block consisting of Filipino films released in the 1950s until the early 2000s. It airs at 12:00 noon on Mondays to Saturdays and 10:00 a.m. on Sundays, with replays at 10:00 p.m. on weekends and on the next day (7:00 a.m. on weekdays and 8:00 a.m. on weekends).
 Block Screening – a block consisting of Tagalog-dubbed foreign movies. It airs at 5:15 p.m. on weekdays, 6:15 p.m. on Saturdays and 6:10 p.m. on Sundays with a replay at 2:00 p.m. the next day.
 Pinoy Movie Date – a block consisting of contemporary Filipino films. It airs at 10:20 p.m. on Mondays to Thursdays, 9:35 p.m. on Fridays and 8:00 p.m. on weekends with next-day replays at 9:00 a.m. on weekdays, 10:00 a.m. on Saturdays, and at 3:15 p.m. on weekdays, 3:30 p.m. on Saturdays and 3:25 p.m. on Sundays.

News
Balitanghali (September 19, 2022 – present)
24 Oras (March 6, 2023 - present)
24 Oras Weekend (March 11, 2023 - present)

Variety
All-Out Sundays (October 16, 2022 – present)

Drama
Mga Lihim ni Urduja (March 6, 2023 - present)
Luv Is: Caught in His Arms (March 6 - 10, 2023)
Hearts on Ice (March 13, 2023 - present)
The Write One (March 20, 2023 - present)

See also 
 GMA Network
 GTV
 Heart of Asia Channel
 Cine Mo!
 Cinema One
 Pinoy Box Office
 Viva Cinema
 SolarFlix
 Movie Central (defunct)

References 

GMA Network (company) channels
Filipino-language television stations
Television channels and stations established in 2021
Television networks in the Philippines
2021 establishments in the Philippines
Movie channels in the Philippines